Ernst Friedrich Glocker (1 May 1793 – 18 July 1858) was a German mineralogist, geologist and paleontologist.

Biography 
From 1810 he studied theology, philosophy and sciences at the University of Tübingen, and afterwards continued his education at Halle. In 1823 he obtained his habilitation with the dissertation thesis, "De Gemmis Plinii inprimis de Topazio", and he later served as a professor at the Magdalene gymnasium in Breslau. In 1834 he became a full professor at the University of Breslau, where he was also director of the mineral cabinet.

During his scientific excursions, he collected minerals and fossils in Silesia, Lusatia, Moravia and the Sudetenland. He is credited with coining the mineral terms: pyrargyrite (1831), ozokerite (1833), sepiolite (1847), halite (1847), sphalerite (1847), arsenopyrite (1847) and liparite (1847). He also conducted research in the field of botany — in 1836 paleobotanist Heinrich Göppert named the plant genus Glockeria in his honor.

Published works 
 Versuch über die Wirkungen des Lichtes auf die Gewächse, 1820 – Experiment involving the effects of light on plants.
 Handbuch der Mineralogie, 1829–31 (2 volumes) – Handbook of mineralogy.
 Versuch einer Charakteristik der schlesisch-mineralogischen Literatur von 1800-1832, (1832) – Characteristics of Silesian mineralogical literature from 1800 to 1832.
 Mineralogische Jahreshefte, 1835 – Mineralogical yearbooks.
 Grundriss der Mineralogie mit Einschluss der Geognosie und Petrefactenkunde, 1839 – Outline of mineralogy with the inclusion of geology and petrology.
 Ueber den Jurakalk von Kurowitz in Mähren und über darin vorkommenden Aptychus imbricatus, 1841 – On the Jurassic limestone of Kurowitz in Mähren. 
 Geognostische beschreibung der preussischen Oberlausitz, 1857 – Geognostic description of Prussian Upper Lusatia.

References

1793 births
1858 deaths
Scientists from Stuttgart
Academic staff of the University of Breslau
University of Tübingen alumni
German mineralogists
19th-century German geologists
German paleontologists